Gaobu is a town located within the Shuixiang Area, which is the fifth largest of six 'areas' under the jurisdiction of Dongguan prefecture-level city in the Pearl River Delta region of Guangdong province, China.

Geography
Gao Bu Town is located south of the Tropic of Cancer, latitude 23 ° 05'-23 ° 08 ', longitude 113 ° 45', and enjoys a subtropical climate, mild climate, evergreen flora and an annual average temperature of around 21.9 ℃.

The town is approximately 7.5 km in width from North to South and 4.5 km wide, with a total area of 34 square kilometers. Gaobu runs along the Dongjiang River tributary and has an elevation of between 1m and 4m. It is often subject to floods and water-logging.

Demographics
In 2009, the official residential population was 162,000, distributed into 37,600 households. Under the jurisdiction of a community, Gaobu has 18 village committees.

Transport
Gaobu is located North of the 'city' area of Dongguan, connected with convenient transportation. The town forms part of the "four vertical and four horizontal" modern transportation network, connecting the Dongguan-Shenzhen Expressway, Guangzhou-Huizhou Expressway, High-speed and Wando East Guangyuan Road. The result is a connection with Guangzhou, Shenzhen, Huizhou and surrounding Towns, creating the vision of a "one hour economic circle." Dongguan city can be reached in around 20 minutes drive from Gaobu. To get to the Guangzhou Baiyun Airport is about 60 minutes drive, and to Shenzhen's Airport is about 40 minutes drive. To reach Humen Port will need around 30 minutes' drive. The Kowloon-Canton railway (KCR) Station in Shilong is 20 minutes away and the Dongguan East railway station is about 40 minutes by car.

Administration

All towns and zones in the Shuixiang Area are as follows:

Economy

Under the township motto "united, energized, pragmatic, dedicated and daring", the Gaobu community has developed an international, export-oriented economy. The town plays host to businesses from Taiwan, Hong Kong, Japan, Germany, Canada, Italy, Belgium, France, South Korea to name a few. The total number is around 200 foreign-invested enterprises, investing a total foreign investment amount of no less than $320 million.

Industries here include electronics, plastics, toys, hardware, shoes, bags and other fashion accessories.

Gaobu is home to some very successful international companies, including Yue Yuen Group, Lee & Man Holding Company, key telecommunications companies, high-tech electronics factories, Bai Hong electronics factory, Jianhong glasses factory, Cosmosupplylab, (one of the top 200 suppliers to Apple Inc.) and eyewear manufacturer and retailer Luxottica .

References

External links 

"Official Website in Chinese"

Geography of Dongguan
Towns in Guangdong